Interstate 690 (I-690) is an auxiliary Interstate Highway that extends for  through the vicinity of Syracuse, New York, in the United States. It is a spur of I-90 (here part of the New York State Thruway) that travels southeast from Thruway exit 39 in Van Buren to I-481 in DeWitt. In between, I-690 passes through the western suburbs of Syracuse before heading east through the city itself, where it meets I-81 in Downtown Syracuse. The expressway continues northwest of the thruway as New York State Route 690 (NY 690).

Route description
I-690 begins at a double trumpet interchange with the New York State Thruway (I-90) in the town of Van Buren. The six-lane, fully-shouldered limited-access highway continues north toward Baldwinsville as NY 690 while I-690 travels east from the junction. Even though I-690 continues north of the thruway as NY 690, the numbering system on I-690 does not continue with the route. The interchange with the thruway is labeled as exit 1, leaving exits on NY 690 without numbers. Additionally, NY 690 is signed north–south while I-690 is signed east–west. Before physically crossing I-90, it features a partial interchange with John Glenn Boulevard and turns southeast.

After crossing and connecting with State Fair Boulevard at exit 5, I-690 runs along the western shore of Onondaga Lake, passing under many pedestrian bridges. The highway serves the New York State Fairgrounds by way of exits 6 and 7, the former a large directional T interchange with NY 695. Within this interchange was a signalized, at-grade intersection that connected I-690 to a parking area. For 12 days each year, the light was used to allow buses to carry New York State Fair attendees from the parking area across the road to the fair. I-690 was one of only a few Interstate Highways to feature a traffic light. Construction began in 2019 and finished in 2020 of a bridge overpass to this parking area, eliminating the need for a traffic signal.

The freeway continues along the shore and bears toward the downtown area, where the shoulders frequently disappear and the buildings are often situated close to the freeway. It passes over a railroad grade and Hiawatha Boulevard before meeting NY 298 (Bear Street) at exit 9. In the interchange with NY 5  to the east, two lanes of I-690 disappear, and I-81 follows directly after in the center of the city with an incomplete interchange. There is no direct freeway ramp from I-690 east to I-81 north and I-81 south to I-690 west. NY 298, which connects to I-81 at exit 22 west of the I-81/I-690 interchange, must be used to make these connections.

I-690 rewidens to six lanes as it proceeds eastward out of Downtown Syracuse.  from downtown, it connects to Burnet and Midler avenues by way of exit 15. The latter is designated as NY 598; however, it is not signed as such from I-690. After a curve to the southeast, NY 635 meets the route at a cloverleaf interchange, utilizing collector–distributor roads to do so. The collector–distributor roads continue to a partial cloverleaf interchange (parclo) with Bridge Street, where they end. Shortly after this interchange, I-690 terminates at I-481.

History
The portion of the modern I-690 corridor west of Downtown Syracuse was originally served by NY 48, a route assigned as part of the 1930 renumbering of state highways in New York. NY 48 followed the length of State Fair Boulevard from Van Buren to Downtown Syracuse, where it followed several local streets to reach NY 5. In the early 1960s, work began on a new freeway extending from the New York State Thruway to Syracuse by way of the western shoreline of Onondaga Lake. The new road, designated as I-690, was completed from the thruway to NY 298 by 1962. I-690 supplanted State Fair Boulevard as the primary highway through the area, and, from NY 297 southeast, State Fair Boulevard was upgraded on the spot. As a result, NY 48 was truncated to its current southern terminus in Van Buren.

The section of I-690 near the New York State Fairgrounds was originally a surface highway. When I-690 was extended eastward through downtown to Midler Avenue (now NY 598) in the mid-1960s, I-690 was moved onto its current, limited-access routing. State Fair Boulevard runs on the former I-690 eastbound right-of-way, while a service road occupies the westbound right of way. State Fair Boulevard continues east along this right-of-way onto a ramp to I-690. The section of I-690 between Midler Avenue and I-481 was completed in the early 1970s. I-690 gained  when its western terminus was relocated in 1987. The interchange with the thruway was relocated and completely rebuilt, forcing a complete renumbering of all the exits on the highway.

I-690 follows the former New York Central Railroad (NYC) roadbed through a portion of Downtown Syracuse and actually cuts through the site of the former Syracuse station. A remnant of the former railroad station platforms is visible to the north of the freeway, with plaster statues of people waiting for trains, who are occasionally dressed up for winter by area residents with scarves and other winter apparel. Time Warner Cable, which restored the building as the base of its Central New York operations and Spectrum News 1 Central New York, also has a rail-focussed mural along the back of that building fronting I-690.

In mid-2009, the New York State Department of Transportation posted new milemarkers on both NY 690 and I-690. The mileposts treat the entire length of both routes as a single entity, with mile 0 being at the northern terminus of NY 690 at NY 48 and mile 20 being near the eastern terminus of I-690 at I-481.

There have been plans for decades to extend I-690 eastward from I-481 to Manlius or to the far east suburb of Chittenango; however, these plans have yet to become a reality.  Several unused ramps exist at the interchange between I-481 and I-690, intended to connect to an extended I-690.

Future
As part of the community grid solution for I-81 in Downtown Syracuse, a  section of I-690 around the intersection with I-81 will be rebuilt. Bridges along this section will be replaced, and the rebuilt highway will feature wider lanes and bigger shoulders. The state is also proposing the elimination of exit 13 (Townsend Street), the restructuring of exits 11 (West Street) and 12 (West Genesee Street), and the addition of an exit at Crouse Avenue and Irving Avenue to provide better access to Syracuse University. Construction along I-690 is part of Phase Two of the community grid project, which would take approximately three years. The entire project is expected to start mid-2020 and take five years. Also, the existing exit numbers along I-690 will be renumbered to reflect the mile-based exit numbers.

Exit list

See also

New York State Route 690 for exits along NY 690

References

External links

90-6
90-6
6
Transportation in Onondaga County, New York
Transportation in Syracuse, New York
Central New York
DeWitt, New York
Onondaga Lake